Peter Dalla Riva (born December 11, 1946), is a former professional Canadian football player with the Montreal Alouettes of the Canadian Football League at the tight end and wide receiver positions.  Dalla Riva played with the Alouettes for his entire 14-year career.  He is a member of the Canadian Football Hall of Fame, and has had his jersey number #74 retired by the club.

Amateur football career 
Born in Treviso, Italy, Dalla Riva arrived in Hamilton, Ontario, Canada with his family in 1953.  Dalla Riva played amateur Canadian football with the Burlington Braves and Oakville Black Knights of the Canadian Junior Football League.

Alouette career 
Dalla Riva began his professional football career with the Alouettes in the 1968 CFL season as a tight end.  He would play for a franchise record 14 seasons, until the 1981 CFL season, including 197 regular season games. He would catch 450 passes for 6,413 yards and scored 55 touchdowns, he was also an excellent blocker. He played in 6 Grey Cup games, winning three: the 58th Grey Cup of 1970, the 62nd Grey Cup of 1974, the 65th Grey Cup of 1977, scoring a touchdown in the latter game, a 7-yard pass from Sonny Wade. He also lost three: the 63rd Grey Cup of 1975, the 66th Grey Cup of 1978, the 67th Grey Cup of 1979. Dalla Riva was named a CFL All-Star 3 times.

Awards, honours, and post-football life 
Dalla Riva's jersey number #74, was retired by the Als on October 24, 1981. In 1993, he was inducted into the Canadian Football Hall of Fame.  In 2006, Dalla Riva was voted to the Honour Roll of the CFL's Top 50 players of the league's modern era by Canadian sports network TSN.

Since his retirement from professional football, Dalla Riva has given much time to participating in community and charity sports events.

References

External links 
CFL Historical Montreal Alouettes - Peter Dalla Riva

1946 births
Living people
Players of Canadian football from Ontario
Canadian football offensive linemen
Canadian football wide receivers
Canadian Football Hall of Fame inductees
Italian emigrants to Canada
Montreal Alouettes players
Sportspeople from Hamilton, Ontario
Canadian football people from Montreal